Lepiota bengalensis is a species of the fungal family Agaricaceae. It was the first generic report for Bangladesh, described as a new species to science in 2016. It is only known from Bangladesh.

See also
List of Lepiota species

References

bengalensis
Fungi of Bangladesh
Fungi described in 2016